Norman Dewis  (3 August 1920 – 8 June 2019) was a British car test driver, who was the test driver for Jaguar Cars from 1952 to 1985. His son Andrew Dewis is also a racing driver

Car development
Dewis participated in the development of the following cars:

 Jaguar XK140
 Jaguar XK150
 Jaguar C-type
 Jaguar D-type
 Jaguar Mark VIII
 Jaguar Mark IX
 Jaguar Mark II
 Jaguar E-type
 Jaguar XJ13
 Jaguar Mark X
 Jaguar XJ6
 Jaguar XJ-S
 Jaguar XJ40

Racing career
Dewis drove a Jaguar D-Type in the 1955 24 Hours of Le Mans, with Don Beauman. The car failed to finish the race, retiring 106 laps into the race.

Jabbeke XK120 record
Dewis was the test driver who, on 20 October 1953 at Jabbeke, Belgium, drove a Jaguar XK120 to 172.412 mph, a record for production cars. The car had several aerodynamic modifications, including a distinctive bubble-shaped, air-tight canopy from a glider aircraft. After the record run the Jaguar XK120 was converted back to a road car and sold by the company.

XJ13 crash
On 21 January 1971 at the MIRA high-speed circuit Dewis drove the only Jaguar XJ13 for a film promoting the new V12 Jaguar E-type. Despite a damaged tyre, and against the instructions of Jaguar Director, Lofty England, the car was driven by Dewis at high speed. The tyre failed and the car crashed heavily, almost destroying it. Dewis was unharmed. The wreck of the car was put back into storage.

Work for Jaguar in retirement
In 2014 Dewis was still attending events related to Jaguar and giving talks about his work for the company. In June 2016 he appeared on the BBC's Top Gear TV show with the Jaguar F-type SVR.

Norman was also a supporter of Jaguar owners and the social scene around owning a car. He was a regular attendee at many of the events held by the Jaguar Drivers' Club, the only Jaguar owners club to be officially recognised by Sir William Lyons and Jaguar as a company.

Honours
In the 2015 New Year Honours Dewis was invested as an Officer of the Most Excellent Order of the British Empire (OBE) for services to the Motor Industry.

References

External links

 Norman Dewis page at the Jaguar Daimler Heritage Trust

1920 births
2019 deaths
English racing drivers
Jaguar Cars
Jaguar Land Rover
Officers of the Order of the British Empire